Melvin Bradford may refer to:

 Mel Bradford (1934–1993), American writer
 Melvin "Mel-Man" Bradford, American music producer